The High Coast Bridge, also known as the Veda Bridge, is a suspension bridge crossing the mouth of the river Ångermanälven near Veda, on the border between the municipalities of Härnösand and Kramfors in the province of Ångermanland in northern Sweden. The area is often referred to as High Coast, hence its name. The older bridge across the same river is the Sandö Bridge, in a new extension of the European route E4.
It is (as of 2016) the third longest suspension bridge in Scandinavia (after the Great Belt Fixed Link in Denmark and Hardanger Bridge in Norway), the fourth longest in Europe, and the 21st longest of the world.

The bridge was constructed between 1993 and 1997 and was officially opened on 1 December 1997 by king Carl XVI Gustaf of Sweden.

The shorter name, the Veda Bridge, refers to the village Veda, which lies 1 km west of the south abutment of the bridge.

References

External links 

 The official website of the High Coast Bridge
 

Suspension bridges in Sweden
Bridges completed in 1997
1997 establishments in Sweden